Vahur Kraft (born 11 March 1961 in Tartu) is an Estonian banker.

In 1984, he graduated from Tartu State University's faculty of economy.

From 1995 to 2005, he was the chairman of the Bank of Estonia. From 2009 to 2013, he was the Honorary Consul to Luxembourg in Estonia.

References

Living people
1961 births
Estonian bankers
Recipients of the Order of the White Star, 2nd Class
University of Tartu alumni
People from Tartu